"I Remember You" is a popular song, published in 1941. The music was written by Victor Schertzinger, with lyrics by Johnny Mercer. The song was originally recorded by Jimmy Dorsey in 1941. It has since been covered most notably by Frank Ifield, Glen Campbell and Björk.

History

"I Remember You" was one of several songs introduced in the film The Fleet's In (1942). 

In 1941, Mercer began an affair with 19-year-old Judy Garland, while she was engaged to composer David Rose. Garland ended her involvement when she married Rose. In later years, Garland and Mercer rekindled their affair. Mercer stated that his song "I Remember You" was the most direct expression of his feelings for Garland.

Renditions
Australian singer Frank Ifield recorded the song in a yodeling country-music style on 27 May 1962, and his version went to number one on the UK Singles Chart, selling 1.1 million copies in the UK alone. The recording stayed at No.1 for seven weeks. It also reached number five on the U.S. Billboard Hot 100 and number one on the U.S. Easy Listening chart.

The Beatles covered the song on stage early in their career, as recorded on an amateur taping made at the Star Club in Hamburg in December 1962. That version was ultimately published in 1977 on the bootleg recording "Live! at the Star-Club in Hamburg, Germany; 1962".

Slim Whitman recorded the song in 1966, taking it to No. 49 on the Billboard Country Chart. In 1980, Whitman re-recorded the song, taking it to No. 44. Whitman's 1966 recording was also featured in the 2003 film House of 1000 Corpses.

Glen Campbell covered the song on his 1987 album Still Within the Sound of My Voice. His version peaked at number 32 on the Billboard Hot Country Singles chart in 1988.

Björk recorded a stripped-down acoustic cover, accompanied by a harp, that is featured on the B-side of her 1993 single, "Venus as a Boy". This version has since become infamous as it is associated with Bjork's stalker Ricardo López who in 1996, after having mailed a letter bomb loaded with sulphuric acid to Björk's London home, filmed his suicide whilst listening to the song in a disturbing video diary  which later became public after being released to journalists.

See also
List of number-one adult contemporary singles of 1962 (U.S.)

References

External links
"I Remember You" at Jazz Standards

 

1941 songs
1962 singles
1988 singles
Dorothy Lamour songs
Frank Ifield songs
Glen Campbell songs
Songs written for films
Songs with lyrics by Johnny Mercer
Songs with music by Victor Schertzinger
UK Singles Chart number-one singles
Number-one singles in Australia
Australian country music songs
1940s jazz standards
Slim Whitman songs